Mary Gehr (1910–1997) was an American painter and printmaker.

Born in Chicago, Gehr studied at Smith College, the School of the Art Institute of Chicago, and the Institute of Design at the Illinois Institute of Technology; her instructors included Paul Wieghardt and Misch Kohn. After attending Smith she danced with the Chicago Opera Company for four seasons, and she spent three years with the Ruth Page-Stone Ballet; she had a featured role in the premiere of the ballet Frankie and Johnny. During her career Gehr specialized in batik and intaglio. She worked as an illustrator as well, producing illustrations for over two dozen books for Children's Press, some of which she also wrote. Several of her pieces are in the collection of the Art Institute of Chicago; she is also represented in the holdings of the Philadelphia Museum of Art, the Free Library of Philadelphia, and the Library of Congress. Gehr was married to the designer Burt Ray, who predeceased her; the couple had a daughter.

References

External links 

 Mary Gehr Papers at Newberry Library

1913 births
1997 deaths
20th-century American painters
20th-century American printmakers
20th-century American women artists
Artists from Chicago
American female dancers
Musicians from Chicago
American women painters
American women printmakers
American women illustrators
American illustrators
20th-century American women writers
20th-century American writers
American women children's writers
American children's writers
Writers from Chicago
Smith College alumni
School of the Art Institute of Chicago alumni
Illinois Institute of Technology alumni
20th-century American dancers